Since 1980, the Los Angeles Times has awarded a set of annual book prizes. The Prizes currently have nine categories: biography, current interest, fiction, first fiction (the Art Seidenbaum Award added in 1991), history, mystery/thriller (category added in 2000), poetry, science and technology (category added in 1989), and young adult fiction (category added in 1998). In addition, the Robert Kirsch Award is presented annually to a living author with a substantial connection to the American West. It is named in honor of Robert Kirsch, the Los Angeles Times book critic from 1952 until his death in 1980 whose idea it was to establish the book prizes.

The Book Prize program was founded by Art Seidenbaum, a Los Angeles Times book editor from 1978 to 1985. An award named for Seidenbaum was added a year after his death in 1990. Works are eligible during the year of their first US publication in English, and may be written originally in languages other than English. The author of each winning book and the Kirsch Award recipient receives a citation and $1,000. The prizes are presented the day before the annual Los Angeles Times Festival of Books.

Winners

Biography

Current interest

Fiction

History

Mystery/thriller

Science and technology

Poetry

Young adult literature

The Art Seidenbaum Award for First Fiction

Graphic Novel/Comics

The Robert Kirsch Award

Innovator's Award

The Christopher Isherwood Prize for Autobiographical Prose 
The Los Angeles Times – Christopher Isherwood Prize for Autobiographical Prose has been awarded in partnership with the Christopher Isherwood Foundation since April 2017 (for 2016).

The Ray Bradbury Prize for Science Fiction, Fantasy & Speculative Fiction

References

External links

Honorees by Year and Award Los Angeles Times Book Prizes.

Los Angeles Times
Biography awards
American non-fiction literary awards
Mystery and detective fiction awards
American poetry awards
First book awards
Literary awards by magazines and newspapers
Awards established in 1980
1980 establishments in California
English-language literary awards